I'd Rather Shout at a Returning Echo than Kid That Someone's Listening is the fourth compilation album released by Some Bizzare Records, containing the first new track from the recently re-formed Soft Cell. It also included two tracks "Nye (We are Silent)" and "Uniform Spaces" by Cabaret Voltaire member Richard H. Kirk. These were recorded under the names "Sandoz" and "Orchestra Terrestrial".

Track listing
Koot  - Walk on Water
Egill  - Oh I Need your Love
Lorien - Sweet Night
Kai Motta  - Looks Like More Rain
Sandoz - Nye (We Are Silent)
Soft Cell - God Shaped Hole
Egill  - I'm Not 100 Per Cent Reliable
Koot  - Reasons
Kai Motta  - Picture That
Lorien - Planet New Earth
The Droidz  - Standing on my Own
Orchestra Terrestrial - Uniform Spaces

Personnel
 Compiled by Stevo Pearce
 Mastered by Ralph Ruppert at Headroom Studio
 Visual Concept by Kram

References

External links
 Some Bizzare Records
 Some Bizzare Records Shop Online
 Some Bizzare Official MySpace Page

2001 compilation albums
Alternative rock compilation albums
Record label compilation albums
Some Bizzare Records compilation albums